Jane Adams (born 1960 in Leicester) is a British writer of psychological thrillers, and has published more than thirty novels.

Her first book, The Greenway, was nominated for a John Creasey Award in 1995 and received an Authors' Club Best First Novel Award.

Personal history 
Adams has a degree in sociology, was once lead vocalist in a folk rock band and is married with two children. She lives in Leicester. Adams teaches at De Montfort University. She is a Royal Literary Fund fellow.

Selected works 
Novels
Bird (1997)
Dangerous to Know (2004)
A Kiss Goodbye (2005)

Detective Mike Croft series
The Greenway (1995)
Cast the First Stone (1996)
Fade to Grey (1998)
Final Frame (1999)

Sergeant Ray Flower series
The Angel Gateway (2000)
Like Angels Falling (2001)
Angel Eyes (2002)

Naomi Blake series
Mourning the Little Dead (2002)
Touching the Dark (2003)
Heatwave (2005)
Killing a Stranger (2006)
Legacy of Lies (2007)
Blood Ties (2010)
Night Vision (2011)
Secrets (2013)
Gregory's Game (2014)
Paying the Ferryman (2014)
A Murderous Mind (2016)
Fakes and Lies (2018)

Rina Martin series
 A Reason to Kill  (2007)
 Fragile Lives  (2008)
 The Power of One  (2009)
 Resolutions  (2010)
 The Dead of Winter  (2011)
 Cause of Death  (2012)
 Forgotten Voices  (2015)

References

External links 
 Bastulli Mystery Library
 Interview with Jane Adams

[[Category:2020
 births]]
English crime fiction writers
English thriller writers
Living people
Writers from Leicester
Women mystery writers
Women thriller writers
1960 births